In geometry, an octagram is an eight-angled star polygon.

The name octagram combine a Greek numeral prefix, octa-, with the  Greek suffix -gram. The -gram suffix derives from γραμμή (grammḗ) meaning "line".

Detail

In general, an octagram is any self-intersecting octagon (8-sided polygon).

The regular octagram is labeled by the Schläfli symbol {8/3}, which means an 8-sided star, connected by every third point.

Variations 
These variations have a lower dihedral, Dih4, symmetry:

The symbol Rub el Hizb is a Unicode glyph ۞ at U+06DE.

As a quasitruncated square

Deeper truncations of the square can produce isogonal (vertex-transitive) intermediate star polygon forms with equal spaced vertices and two edge lengths. A truncated square is an octagon, t{4}={8}. A quasitruncated square, inverted as {4/3}, is an octagram, t{4/3}={8/3}.

The uniform star polyhedron stellated truncated hexahedron, t'{4,3}=t{4/3,3} has octagram faces constructed from the cube in this way. It may be considered for this reason as a three-dimensional analogue of the octagram.

Another three-dimensional version of the octagram is the nonconvex great rhombicuboctahedron (quasirhombicuboctahedron), which can be thought of as a quasicantellated (quasiexpanded) cube, t0,2{4/3,3}.

Star polygon compounds 
There are two regular octagrammic star figures (compounds) of the form {8/k}, the first constructed as two squares {8/2}=2{4}, and second as four degenerate digons, {8/4}=4{2}. There are other isogonal and isotoxal compounds including rectangular and rhombic forms.

{8/2} or 2{4}, like Coxeter diagrams  + , can be seen as the 2D equivalent of the 3D compound of cube and octahedron,  + , 4D compound of tesseract and 16-cell,  +  and 5D compound of 5-cube and 5-orthoplex; that is, the compound of a n-cube and cross-polytope in their respective dual positions.

Other presentations of an octagonal star
An octagonal star can be seen as a concave hexadecagon, with internal intersecting geometry erased. It can also be dissected by radial lines.

Other uses 
 In Unicode, the "Eight Spoked Asterisk" symbol ✳ is U+2733.

 The 8-pointed diffraction spikes of the star images from the James Webb Space Telescope are due to the diffraction caused by the hexagonal shape of the mirror sections and the struts holding the secondary mirror.

See also

Usage
 Rub el Hizb – Islamic character
 Star of Ishtar – symbol of the ancient Sumerian goddess Inanna and her East Semitic counterpart Ishtar and Roman Venus.
 Star of Lakshmi – Indian character
 Surya Majapahit – usage during Majapahit times in Indonesia to represent the Hindu gods of the directions
 Compass rose – usage in compasses to represent the cardinal directions for the eight principal winds
 Auseklis – usage of regular octagram by Latvians
 Guñelve – representation of Venus in Mapuche iconography.
 Selburose – usage of regular octagram in Norwegian design
 Utu – ancient Mesopotamian god symbol and symbol of the Sun god

Stars generally
 Star (polygon)
 Stellated polygons
 Two-dimensional regular polytopes

Others
 Hexadecagram
 Dodecagram

References

 Grünbaum, B. and G.C. Shephard; Tilings and Patterns, New York: W. H. Freeman & Co., (1987), .
 Grünbaum, B.; Polyhedra with Hollow Faces, Proc of NATO-ASI Conference on Polytopes ... etc. (Toronto 1993), ed T. Bisztriczky et al., Kluwer Academic (1994) pp. 43–70.
 John H. Conway, Heidi Burgiel, Chaim Goodman-Strass, The Symmetries of Things 2008,  (Chapter 26. pp. 404: Regular star-polytopes Dimension 2)

External links
 

08
8 (number)